Slape is a settlement on the Dravinja River in the Municipality of Majšperk in northeastern Slovenia. There is also a dam and the only mill in the municipality. The area is part of the traditional region of Styria. It is now included with the rest of the municipality in the Drava Statistical Region.

In 1986 traces of a prehistoric Early Iron Age settlement were discovered in the area.

References

External links
 Slape at Geopedia

Populated places in the Municipality of Majšperk